The Bradford Times was a weekly community newspaper founded in October 1991 and terminated in November, 2017.

History

The Bradford West Gwillimbury Times served the Bradford West Gwillimbury, south Innisfil and Holland Marsh areas for over 18 years – covering local Town Council, charity and cultural events, sports and business news. It was delivered free by carrier, throughout its distribution area. Miriam King was the Editor since the paper was first published.

Shutdown
The Bradford Times was one of several Postmedia newspapers purchased by Torstar in a transaction between the two companies which concluded on November 27, 2017. The closure of the paper was effective immediately.

See also
List of newspapers in Canada

References

External links
 The Bradford West Gwillimbury Times

Torstar publications
Weekly newspapers published in Ontario
Publications established in 1991
1991 establishments in Ontario
Publications disestablished in 2017
2017 disestablishments in Ontario
Defunct newspapers published in Ontario
Defunct weekly newspapers